Sashi Brown (born May 15, 1976) is an attorney and American football executive who is the president of the Baltimore Ravens of the National Football League (NFL). Brown began his NFL career with the Jacksonville Jaguars and Cleveland Browns.

Career
Brown earned a bachelor's degree from Hampton University in 1998, and a Juris Doctor degree from Harvard Law School in 2002. After graduating, Brown was an attorney with Wilmer, Cutler, Pickering, Hale and Dorr, a private law firm based in Washington, D.C. As a member of the firm's corporate law practice group, Brown advised companies in a variety of business transactions. Brown is a member of the New York, District of Columbia and Florida bars. He also runs his own investment firm.

Jacksonville Jaguars
In addition to his attorney career, he has also served as a sports front office executive. From 2005 to 2012, Brown was the lead counsel for the Jacksonville Jaguars of the National Football League. While working with the Jaguars organization, Brown served as a member of the Board of Directors and Chairman of the Section 8 Subcommittee to the Jacksonville                                                                                          Housing Authority. He also played a role in negotiating the naming rights deal for EverBank Field.

Cleveland Browns
From 2013 until 2017, he worked as an executive vice president for the Cleveland Browns of the National Football League, effectively making him the de facto general manager for the 2016 season and part of the 2017 season.

Washington Wizards
In 2019, he was hired as the chief planning and operations officer for Ted Leonsis' company Monumental Sports & Entertainment, which includes the Washington Wizards of the NBA, the Washington Mystics of the WNBA and the Capital City Go-Go of the NBA G League.

Baltimore Ravens
Brown was appointed on February 4, 2022 to succeed Dick Cass as president of the Baltimore Ravens beginning April 1.

References

External links
Baltimore Ravens bio

1976 births
Living people
African-American sports executives and administrators
Cleveland Browns executives
Jacksonville Jaguars executives
Baltimore Ravens executives
Harvard Law School alumni
Hampton University alumni
National Football League general managers
Washington Wizards executives
Washington Mystics executives
American lawyers
African-American lawyers
21st-century African-American sportspeople
20th-century African-American sportspeople